Eli, Op. 7, is an opera in three acts with music by Walter Steffens to a libretto based on a play by Nelly Sachs. The world premiere was in 1967 at the Opernhaus Dortmund.

History 

Eli was a commission from the city of Dortmund as the first world premiere to be performed at the new Opernhaus Dortmund which was inaugurated in 1966. The composer wrote the libretto for the opera in three acts (12 scenes) based on a 1943 mystery play by Nelly Sachs. The city of Dortmund awards a literature prize in her name, the Nelly Sachs Prize. Her play was first entitled Eli: Ein Legendenspiel vom Leiden Israels (Eli: A mystery play of the sufferings of Israel), later changed to Eli: Ein Mysterienspiel... It was premiered by Theater Dortmund on 14 March 1962. The opera was published by Bärenreiter.

The action is in single episodes, without a plot. It is set in a Polish village right after World War II, where a Jewish boy, Eli, was slain by a German soldier during a pogrom, and is remembered in various ways. Walter Steffens, a resident of Dortmund, worked on the composition from 1964 to 1966.

The world premiere of the opera was on 5 March 1967 in the Opernhaus Dortmund, directed by Hans Hartleb, with Hainer Hill as designer of stage and costumes, and Wilhelm Schüchter conducting.

Roles 
The first performance was at the Opernhaus Dortmund on 5 March 1967, conducted by Wilhelm Schüchter. Many singers take more than one role:

Reception 
A reviewer from Süddeutsche Zeitung noted that Steffens transports the poetry to a different level of emotional intensity. He described the vocal and instrumental lines as expressive and melodic ("Expressiv-melodische Diktion"), and the electro-acoustic parts as unreal voices.

References

Further reading 

 Christine Longère: Zu den Opern (in German) walter-steffens.de

Operas
1967 operas
Operas based on plays
German-language operas
Operas set in Poland